The Chillón River is a river located in western Peru. Its waters are produced by the melting of ice in the glaciers of the Andes, and its mouth is located in the Pacific Ocean coast of the Callao Region. Its volume gets higher during the summer months (December to March). The river's valley is very fertile.  It has been inhabited by varying indigenous cultures for more than ten thousand years, as shown by archeological evidence.

The 4,000-year-old ruins known as El Paraíso are located 40 kilometres north-east of Lima in the Chillón River Valley. A temple at the site is believed to be about 5,000 years old, if the date is confirmed it would be among the oldest sites in the world, comparable to the ancient city of Caral, a coastal city 200 kilometres to the north.

References

Rivers of Peru
Rivers of Lima Region